The Judiciary Reform Commission (KRSS) is a commission set up in Kyrgyzstan to examine the “Basic directions of judiciary reform in the Kyrgyz Republic” with a view to setting out a reform package to be implemented before 2016. The chairman of the group is Omurbek Tekebayev.

References

Politics of Kyrgyzstan
Political organisations based in Kyrgyzstan
Judiciary of Kyrgyzstan